Vincent Capo-Canellas (born 1967) is a French politician. He serves as a Senator for Seine-Saint-Denis.

Biography

Early life
Vincent Capo-Canellas was born on 4 May 1967 in Nîmes. He received a degree in Political Science.

Career
Prior to politics, he worked as a local civil servant.

He is a member of the Union of Democrats and Independents. He has served as the Mayor of Le Bourget since 2001. Additionally, since 1 October 2011, he has served as a Senator for Seine-Saint-Denis.

He is an Officer in the Ordre des Arts et des Lettres.

References

External links
Official blog

1967 births
Living people
People from Nîmes
French Senators of the Fifth Republic
Officiers of the Ordre des Arts et des Lettres
Union of Democrats and Independents politicians
Senators of Seine-Saint-Denis
Mayors of places in Île-de-France